Titus W. Carr House is a historic home and national historic district located near Walstonsburg, Greene County, North Carolina.  The house was built about 1870, and is a two-story, double pile, three bay, transitional Greek Revival / Italianate style dwelling.  It has a low hip roof and one-story full width front porch.  Also on the property is a contributing smokehouse / storage house (c. 1870), smokehouse (c. 1900), former kitchen (c. 1870), and woodshed.

It was listed on the National Register of Historic Places in 1987.

References

Houses on the National Register of Historic Places in North Carolina
Historic districts on the National Register of Historic Places in North Carolina
Greek Revival houses in North Carolina
Italianate architecture in North Carolina
Houses completed in 1870
Buildings and structures in Greene County, North Carolina
National Register of Historic Places in Greene County, North Carolina